Qrashel or Krachel or Lgorss are Moroccan traditional sweet sesame rolls, made with anise and fennel. They can be served with tea or coffee, and dipped in cheese, olive oil, jam or honey. The rolls are similar to French brioche, but the anise seeds give them an extra flavor.

Qrashel are known in Moroccan cuisine at least since the late Wattasid and early Saadian era (mid 16th century). The Wattasid governor of Marrakech, Nasser Bouchentouf, was notoriously murdered with poisoned Qrashel.

Name 
The Moroccan term "Qrashel" is in the plural form, with the singular "qershala", and diminutive "qrishla". The later can also refer to small sesame Moroccan sweets, that otherwise share no resemblance with Qrashel.

The name of these Moroccan buns can differ from region to region. "Krach" is common in northern Morocco, while "krachet" is common in the southern regions.

Recipe 
The recipe for Qrashel can differ from region to region. But most commonly would include milk, eggs, anise seeds, sesame, sugar, baker's yeast, orange flower water, butter and flour. Some recipes also add chocolate.

The preparation of the dough can take up to 2 hours, while the baking can take around 30 to 40 minutes in a pre-heated oven to 350 degrees F (around 175 C).

References 

Moroccan cuisine
Buns